Bibb County School District vs. Wickman (2005) was a case heard before the Supreme Court of the State of Alabama. It ruled that a policy permitting student-led, student-initiated prayer at football games held at private venues and initiated by personnel of said venue does not violate the Establishment Clause of the First Amendment. Oral arguments were heard April 6, 2005. The court announced its decision on June 27, holding the policy constitutional in a 6–3 decision. School prayer is a controversial topic in American jurisprudence.

Background of the case
The Bibb County School District (BCSD), a school district in Alabama between Birmingham and Montgomery, allowed students to offer Christian prayers over the public address system at home football games held off of school property at a private venue. These prayers were given by a student selected by the director of the private venue.

A pair of former students and their father—a Mormon, objected to this practice and filed a suit on the basis of a violation of the Establishment Clause. These are the Wickmans.

During the litigation, the school held its policy: as long as they held football games off of school district property and off of property controlled by the county, they would allow students to pray before sporting events if the director(s) of the venue holding the event invited a student to pray over the stadium's public announcement system.

The district court allowed this policy, though it required that they be nonsectarian and non-proselytizing. The judge's main authority was Thomas v. Dothan SD (Dothan School District being another Alabama school district), which allows certain types of school prayers at sporting events. The district court's final judgment was in December 2003.

The Wickmans appealed to the Alabama Supreme Court. The Wickmans appealed, wanting the football prayers found unconstitutional altogether, citing Santa Fe Independent School Dist. v. Doe.

The Wickmans chose not to appeal to the United States Supreme Court after the decision was rendered, since Bibb County took possession of all sporting venues within the county, effectively eliminating their right to pray prior to school events. This did not, however, nullify the court's decision.

The court's decision
The Court held that the policy allowing the student-led prayer at the football games was constitutional and in no way violated the establishment clause of the first amendment to the constitution.  The majority opinion, written by Chief Justice Cobb depended on Santa Fe Independent School Dist. v. Doe, 530 U.S. 290 and Lee v. Weisman, 505 U.S. 577. It held that pre-game prayers delivered on school property, at school-sponsored events, over the school's public address system, by a speaker representing the student body, under the supervision of school faculty, and pursuant to a school policy that explicitly and implicitly encourages public prayer are public speech, but that the school, and by definition the district and state were not fully represented when the school was invited to play off school property, using facilities not owned, operated, or related to the school faculty, and therefore the state was not responsible for prayers made by students, if said student was invited by the operation staffs of the private facility being used.

A dissenting opinion was written by Justice Patricia M. Smith, joined by Justices Glenn Murdock and Greg Shaw. Her dissent stated that the majority opinion "failed to recognize the many precedents set throughout the years, both on the state and national level, especially the Santa Fe ISD case, which explicitly outlaw prayer sponsored by public institutions in any way".

See also
 Santa Fe Independent School Dist. v. Doe
 Lee v. Weisman
 List of United States Supreme Court cases, volume 530

Establishment Clause case law